The 2018 Guangzhou Evergrande Taobao season is the 65th year in Guangzhou Evergrande's existence and its 51st season in the Chinese football league, also its 29th season in the top flight. The club appointed Italian manager Fabio Cannavaro as manager for the second time on 9 November 2017 after Luiz Felipe Scolari refused to extend his contract. The chairman of the club was changed to Gao Han by owner Evergrande Group on the same day.

Transfers

In

Winter

Summer

Out

Winter

Summer

Pre-season and friendlies

Training matches

The Dubai International Cup 2018

Competitions

Chinese Super League

Table

Results by round

Results summary

Matches

Chinese FA Cup

Chinese FA Super Cup

AFC Champions League

Group stage

Knockout stage

Round of 16 

2–2 on aggregate. Guangzhou lost on away goals.

Statistics

Appearances and goals

Goalscorers

Disciplinary record

Notes

References

Guangzhou F.C.
Guangzhou F.C. seasons